A cookie is a baked or cooked good that is small, flat and sweet (UK English: biscuit)

Cookie or The Cookies may also refer to:

People
 Cookie (nickname)
 Cookie (singer), British soul singer Janet Ramus
 Cookie, a ring name of Becky Bayless, American professional wrestler

Animals
 Cookie (cockatoo) (1933–2016), a Major Mitchell's Cockatoo believed to be the oldest of his species in captivity

Arts, entertainment, and media

Fictional characters
 Cookie (cat), a cat on the television series Blue Peter
 Cookie Kwan, from The Simpsons
 Cookie Lyon from Empire
 Vernon "Cookie" Locke, from the Australian television serial A Country Practice
 Simon Nelson-Cook or Cookie, in Ned's Declassified School Survival Guide
 Cookie Masterson, one of the hosts of the You Don't Know Jack video games

Films
 Cookie (film), a 1989 American film starring Peter Falk
 Cookies (film), a 1975 French drama film

Literature
 Cookie (novel), a 2008 novel by Jacqueline Wilson
Cookies: Bite-Size Life Lessons, a 2006 picture book

Music

Groups
 Cookies (Hong Kong band), a Cantopop music group
 Cookies (New York band), an electro-pop group
 Cookie and his Cupcakes, an American swamp pop band
 The Cookies (girl group), an American 1950-60s girl music group

Albums
 Cookies (album), a 2007 album by the band 1990s
 Cookie (album), a 1994 album by the English alternative rock band Lush
 Cookie: The Anthropological Mixtape, a 2002 album by American R&B singer Meshell Ndegeocello
 Cookie, song by R. Kelly from Black Panties album

Songs
 "Cookie" (song), by NewJeans, 2022

Periodicals
 Cookie (American magazine), an American magazine, published from 2005 to 2009
 Cookie (Japanese magazine), a Japanese magazine founded in 1999

Other arts, entertainment, and media
 Cookie (video game), for the ZX Spectrum

Computing and technology

Computing
 HTTP cookie, a small parcel of information stored on computers by websites
 Magic cookie, a token or short packet of data that is typically not meaningful to the recipient program

Other computing and technology
 Cookie (bomb), a type of military blockbuster bomb
 Cookie, a non-directional line marker used in cave diving
 Cuculoris or cookie, a device for casting shadows
 LG Cookie (KP500), a mobile phone by LG Electronics

See also 
 Cook (disambiguation)
 
 
 Cookie Monster (disambiguation)